Duas may refer to:

 Duas Barras, Rio de Janeiro, Brazil
 Duas Igrejas (Paredes), Paredes, Porto, Portugal

See also

 Dua (disambiguation)
 Dual (disambiguation)